Doctor Atilio Oscar Viglione  is a village and municipality in Chubut Province in southern Argentina.

References

Populated places in Chubut Province